Birmingham Small Heath was a parliamentary constituency centred on the Small Heath area of Birmingham.  It returned one Member of Parliament (MP)  to the House of Commons of the Parliament of the United Kingdom.

The constituency was created for the 1950 general election, and abolished for the 1997 general election, when it was partly replaced by the new Birmingham Sparkbrook and Small Heath constituency.

Boundaries 
Throughout its existence the constituency (as can be inferred from its name) included Small Heath ward, but that district was linked with various adjoining parts of the inner-city area of Birmingham. In its first three incarnations the constituency was to the south east of the city centre. Its boundaries moved more to the east of the city centre in the 1983 redistribution.

1950–1955: The County Borough of Birmingham wards of Duddeston, Saltley, and Small Heath. Before 1950 Duddeston ward had been part of Birmingham Duddeston and the other two wards had been part of Birmingham Yardley.

1955–1974: The County Borough of Birmingham wards of Deritend, Saltley, and Small Heath. Deritend ward was formerly part of Birmingham Sparkbrook. Duddeston ward was transferred to Birmingham Ladywood.

1974–1983: The County Borough of Birmingham wards of Duddeston, Newtown, Saltley, and Small Heath. Duddeston ward had formerly been in Birmingham Ladywood. Deritend ward was transferred to Birmingham Edgbaston.

1983–1997: The City of Birmingham wards of Aston, Nechells, and Small Heath. 72.7% of the new constituency came from the old one, 11.9% from Birmingham Handsworth (Aston ward) and smaller amounts from Birmingham Sparkbrook (6.1%), Birmingham Erdington (4.9%), Birmingham Yardley (2.6%) and Birmingham Ladywood (1.7%).

In the 1997 redistribution, this constituency disappeared. Small Heath ward joined a new seat of Birmingham Sparkbrook and Small Heath, while Aston and Nechells wards became part of the redrawn Birmingham Ladywood.

Members of Parliament

Election results

Elections in the 1950s

Elections in the 1960s

Elections in the 1970s

Elections in the 1980s

Elections in the 1990s

See also
List of former United Kingdom Parliament constituencies

References 

 Boundaries of Parliamentary Constituencies 1885-1972, compiled and edited by F.W.S. Craig (Parliamentary Reference Publications 1972)
 British Parliamentary Constituencies: A Statistical Compendium, by Ivor Crewe and Anthony Fox (Faber and Faber 1984)
 British Parliamentary Election Results 1950-1973, compiled and edited by F.W.S. Craig (Parliamentary Research Services 1983)
 British Parliamentary Election Results 1974-1983, compiled and edited by F.W.S. Craig (Parliamentary Research Services 1984)
 Britain Votes 4, compiled and edited by F.W.S. Craig (Parliamentary Research Services 1988)
 Britain Votes 5, compiled and edited by Colin Rallings and Michael Thrasher  (Parliamentary Research Services - Dartmouth Publishing 1993)
 Who's Who of British Members of Parliament, Volume IV 1945-1979, edited by M. Stenton and S. Lees (Harvester Press 1981)

Politics of Warwickshire
Parliamentary constituencies in Birmingham, West Midlands (historic)
Constituencies of the Parliament of the United Kingdom established in 1950
Constituencies of the Parliament of the United Kingdom disestablished in 1997
Small Heath, Birmingham